Hotel Metropolitan Premier Taipei (Chinese：JR 東日本大飯店台北) is a five star hotel located in Zhongshan District, Taipei, Taiwan. The hotel opened on 23 August 2021 and is the first overseas branch operated by JR Hotel Group, an affiliate of East Japan Railway Company. The hotel occupied the building on Nanjing East Road, which is owned by Cathay Life and has remained idle for the past 10 months after the previous tenant Westin Taipei ceased operations in January.

Location
The hotel is located at the heart of Taipei, near Taipei Songshan Airport, and Taipei Main Station. It is one minute's walk from Nanjing Fuxing metro station.

Facilities
Hotel Metropolitan Premier Taipei is operated by JR Hotel Group and offers a total of 288 guest rooms and suites, spanning a total of 15 floors. It features three restaurants, including Japanese cuisine and Chinese cuisine, as well as banquet rooms, swimming pools, fitness facilities and other modern amenities. The hotel's facilities aim to meet the diverse needs of guests staying for both business and leisure.

See also
 Regent Taipei

References

External links
Official website

2021 establishments in Taiwan
Hotels in Taipei
Hotels established in 2021
Hotel buildings completed in 1999